Bôa (stylized bôa) is an English alternative rock band formed in London in 1993 by drummer Ed Herten, keyboard player Paul Turrell, and guitarist/vocalist Steve Rodgers. The band progressed from a funk band to a rock band over the years, as bassist Alex Caird and multi-instrumentalist Ben Henderson joined the group, and Jasmine Rodgers was added as vocalist. They produced two major albums, Twilight (2001) and Get There (2005). Their track "Duvet" was the opening theme song to the anime television series Serial Experiments Lain. The band was originally signed by Polystar in Japan and produced their first album The Race of a Thousand Camels (1998). However, the band decided to change labels and signed with Pioneer LDC (now called NBCUniversal Entertainment Japan) to produce their album Twilight (2001). Bôa's current lineup consists of Jasmine Rodgers (vocals), Steve Rodgers (vocals and guitar), Alex Caird (bass), and Lee Sullivan (drums and piano).

Following their success with Twilight, the band decided to create their own independent label called Bôa Recordings to produce. Get There was released on 1 February 2005. It took Bôa in a new direction, with more structure in lyrics and melody, as well as a more mellow, yet more harder-edged/indie rock format. It also had more acoustic elements than the first album.

Career

Originally a funk band, Bôa was formed in 1993 by drummer Ed Herten, keyboardist Paul Turrell, and Steve Rodgers on guitar and vocals.

Alex Caird, who had played with Ed in another band Draggin' Bones, was soon recruited on bass guitar. Steve's younger sister, Jasmine Rodgers, was invited to sing the chorus part of one of their first songs called "Fran", and she soon became the lead singer of the group. Ben Henderson, who had played with Alex in the band Doctor Sky, was recruited shortly afterwards to play saxophone.

Their first live performance was in January 1994 at the London Forum, supporting Steve and Jasmine's father, classic rock singer Paul Rodgers (of Free & Bad Company fame). In the summer of the same year, Ed Herten decided to leave the band to concentrate on his studies. The new drummer, Lee Sullivan, is the son of Terry Sullivan, the drummer in the band Renaissance. Lee brought a rockier feel to the group's sound which complemented a natural progression away from funk by the band and a migration from saxophone to guitar by Ben Henderson.

Bôa honed their live performances with many gigs across the South of England such as the Glastonbury festival (1995). As a result of their Glastonbury performance, they were chosen as the focus of a TV documentary about the festival that was later distributed on the London show "Shift".  In 1996, they accepted a recording contract with a Japanese Company, Polystar. They recorded three songs, "Twilight", "Deeply", and "Elephant" in London, with producer Darren Allison (Spiritualized, The Divine Comedy) at the Red Bus studios in London. They recorded further tracks for the album with producer Neil Walsh at the Monnow Valley Studios. Although the album was recorded and produced in England, Jasmine and Steve traveled to Japan in 1998 to promote the debut album Race of the Thousand Camels, which was released only in that country.

While signed with Polystar, the band released their first single in 1998, called "Duvet". It was a success in Japan, and became the opening theme of the anime series Serial Experiments Lain. "Duvet" was also on the 1998 album Race of a Thousand Camels in Japan. Meanwhile, Boa was working with producer Stuart Epps on new material including an acoustic version of "Duvet" and the song "Drinking".

In 2000, Polystar released both the Tall Snake EP, and featured "Duvet" on the 20th Anniversary of Polystar Collection Vol.1 Female Vocal Love Songs compilation. The Tall Snake EP was released in Japan featuring all three versions of "Duvet" and two songs ("Little Miss" and "Two Steps"). However, in 2000, Ben Henderson left the band to concentrate on his other band, Moth, with his wife, singer songwriter Tina Henderson, who together currently record and perform regularly at Steampunk festivals and events in the UK.

Bôa began touring more extensively and used this time to gain inspiration for their next album. In 2000, Bôa performed a live concert at the Otakon convention and was well received by fans of the Serial Experiments Lain series. In September 2002, they held a live performance at the Hammersmith Apollo (London) and received strong accolades for their performance.

In 2001, due to contractual disagreements with Polystar, the band changed labels and signed with Pioneer LDC (now known as Geneon Universal). Race of a Thousand Camels was retitled Twilight and released to a US audience in 2001 by Pioneer Music. Twilight consisted of songs from their original Japanese album plus other new tracks. They worked closely with Todd Culberhouse and toured in the US to promote the album. Halfway through the tour, Paul Turrell left the band to pursue other interests. However, the band went on to finish the tour and played at the Animefest in Dallas, Texas (Aug 2001).

"Duvet" was remixed by DJ Wasei and in October 2003 was released on another Lain soundtrack titled Serial Experiment Lain Soundtrack: Cyberia Mix. The band also released a video to go with the single which was reported to have been filmed on top of the roof of Lee Sullivan's flat.

By 2003, the band decided to establish their own recording label, called Boa Recordings. They started recording their third successful album titled Get There and released it under their own label in 2004.  The album was sold on the iTunes Store, and both their albums Twilight and Get There were sold by their official distributor CD Baby.

In September 2004, Steve and Jasmine performed "Drinking" with their father, Paul Rodgers, at The Strat Pack. The Strat Pack was a concert featuring Joe Walsh, Gary Moore, Brian May, David Gilmour, and many more, marking the 50th Anniversary of the Fender Stratocaster guitar. The film was released in 2005.

In 2012, the band started a JustGiving page and announced their support to raise money for AAR JAPAN, a charity that responded to the impact of the 2011 tsunami.

On January 4, 2017, former keyboard player Paul Turrell passed away, which the band announced via their Facebook page on the following day.

In May 2017, an unreleased Bôa album was discovered on late keyboard player Paul Turrell's website titled The Farm.

In December 2018, a vinyl edition of Duvet was released exclusively for the Japanese market. This was a surprise to Bôa, who were not aware of the pressing of the record. The band shared the news on their official Facebook page and asked if fans bought the edition from Japan.

Members
Current members
 Jasmine Rodgers – vocals (1993–present)
 Steve Rodgers – electric and acoustic guitars (1993–present)
 Alex Caird – bass guitars (1993–present)
 Lee Sullivan – drums, percussion, keyboards (1994–present)

Former members
 Paul Turrell – keyboards, strings arrangements, percussion, electric guitars (1993–2001; died 2017)
 Ed Herten – drums, percussion (1993–1994)
 Ben Henderson – electric and acoustic guitars, saxophone, percussion (1993–2000)

Timeline

Discography

Studio albums
 The Race of a Thousand Camels (1998)
 Twilight (2001)
 Get There (2005)
 The Farm (unreleased, first uploaded in 2017)

EPs
 Duvet (1997)
 Tall Snake EP (1999)

Soundtrack & Compilation appearances
 Serial Experiments of Lain OST 'Duvet' (1998)
 Duvet on 20th Anniversary Of Polystar Collection Vol.1 Female Vocal Love Songs (2000)
 Serial Experiment Lain Soundtrack: Cyberia Mix 'Duvet remix' (2003)

Film
 The Strat Pack: Live in Concert (2005)

References

External links
 
 BoAUK Official YouTube Channel
 Paul Turrell's web site (Boa 1993 - 2001)
 Jasmine Rodgers' MySpace page
 Jasmine Rodgers' Official Website
 Moth's website

English indie rock groups
Musical groups from London
Musical groups established in 1993
1993 establishments in England